Oksana Lytvyn (born June 15, 1961 in Rivne Oblast) is a Ukrainian couturier and designer of handwoven one-of-a-kind garments. She also produces gobelins.

Biography 
Lytvyn was born in 1961 in the village of Horynhrad near Rivne in Ukraine.
She and her designer husband Yaroslav Sakhro live and work in the city of Kolomyya in the Carpathian mountains.

Education 
She was educated first at the Shevchenko State Art School where her classmates included Kost Lavro, Alina Panova, Yuri Makoveychuk and Roman Turovsky. She finished her education at the Lviv Institute of Decorative and Applied Arts.

References 

1961 births
Living people
People from Rivne
Shevchenko State Art School alumni
20th-century Ukrainian women artists
21st-century Ukrainian women artists